"All That I Am" is a song by American R&B singer Joe. It was written by Larry Lofton and Mattias Gustafsson for his same-titled second studio album (1997), while production was helmed by Joe and Edwin "Tony" Nicholas. Released as the album's sixth and final single, it reached number 52 on the UK Singles Chart.

Track listings

Credits and personnel
 Mattias Gustafsson – writer
 Jed Hackett – mastering
 Larry Lofton – writer
 Edwin "Tony" Nicholas – producer
 Gerard Smerek – mixing
 Joe Thomas – producer, vocals

Charts

References

1997 songs
1997 singles
Joe (singer) songs
Song recordings produced by Joe (singer)
Jive Records singles